Wo Hop is a restaurant in Chinatown, Manhattan, New York City.

Wo Hop may also refer to:

Wo Hop Shek, an area in the south of Fanling, Hong Kong
Wo Hop Shek Public Cemetery
Wo Hop To, a Hong Kong Triad